Johnnie B. Byrd Jr. (born February 8, 1951) is a former member of the Florida House of Representatives from District 62 representing Eastern Hillsborough County from 1996 through 2004. He was speaker of the House from 2002 to 2004.

In 2004, Byrd made an unsuccessful run for the U.S. Senate seat vacated by retiring Senator Bob Graham as a Republican candidate. He was fourth in a field of six with 68,982 votes, 5.9 percent of the vote. Mel Martinez won the primary and the general election. Prior public service included a spell as a school board member of the Brewton City School System in Brewton, Alabama.

Personal life

Byrd moved to Florida in 1988, and joined the law firm Trinkle, Redman, Moody, Swanson and Byrd. Byrd is currently the managing partner in  Byrd & Barnhill, P.L., in Plant City.

He holds a BS in business administration from Auburn University and a JD from the University of Alabama School of Law.

Byrd is the founder and a member of the board of the Johnnie B. Byrd Sr. Alzheimer's Institute at the University of South Florida. He is a past president of the Plant City Chamber of Commerce, a trustee of Evangelical University and Seminary and a member of the Plant City Rotary Club.

In 2012, Byrd ran for Thirteenth Circuit Court Judge, but lost to Mark R. Wolfe. Wolfe received 63.3% of the vote to Byrd's 36.7%.

Electoral history

References

External links 
 Florida House of Representatives-Johnnie Byrd
 Byrd & Barnhill, P.L. Attorneys at Law
 USF Byrd Alzheimer's Institute
 2004 campaign website
 

|-

1951 births
Living people
People from Brewton, Alabama
Auburn University alumni
University of Alabama alumni
People from Plant City, Florida
Republican Party members of the Florida House of Representatives
Speakers of the Florida House of Representatives